Maite Ruiz de Austri (born 1959) is a Spanish writer, screenwriter, and film and television director, specializing in programs for children and young adults.

Career
For more than 25 years, until 2018, Maite Ruiz de Austri was the only woman in Spain to direct animated feature films. She has produced a long list of award-winning films, television programs, and series. In addition, she is a screenwriter and director of television series, documentaries of both animation and fiction.

She is a member of the Academy of Sciences and Cinematographic Arts of Spain.

Awards and recognitions

 1995 Goya Award for Best Animated Film for The Return of the North Wind
 1999 Goya Award for Best Animated Film for Qué vecinos tan animales!
 Nominated for 2002 Goya Award for Best Animated Film for The Legend of the Unicorn
 Gold Medal and Platinum Remi Award at the 2009 Houston International Film Festival for Animal Channel
 Nominated for 2010 Goya Award for Best Animated Film for Animal Channel
 Nominated for 2011 Goya Award for Best Animated Film for El tesoro del rey Midas
 Nominated for 2014 Goya Award for Best Animated Film for El Extraordinario Viaje de Lucius Dumb

Filmography
 1992 - The Legend of the North Wind
 1993 - The Return of the North Wind
 1998 - Que vecinos tan animales!
 2001 - The Legend of the Unicorn
 2008 - Animal Channel
 2010 - El tesoro del rey Midas
 2013 - El extraordinario viaje de Lucius Dumb: Los derechos humanos tu mejor instrumento
 2018 - La bola dorada

References

External links
 

1959 births
Spanish animated film directors
Film directors from Madrid
Goya Award winners
Living people
Spanish animators
Spanish women film directors
Spanish women screenwriters
Spanish women animators